The Right Approach is a 1961 CinemaScope drama film directed by David Butler and starring Juliet Prowse, Frankie Vaughan (in his final film role) and Martha Hyer.

It was known as The Live Wire.

Plot
Army buddies return home to Pasadena, California, and convert a restaurant known as The Hut into a five-man bachelor pad.

One of them has a brother, Leo Mack (Frankie Vaughan), who will stop at nothing in his desire to succeed as an actor. Leo cons the guys out of clothes and money. He also conspires with a carhop, Ursula (Juliet Prowse), who hopes to seduce one of the roommates. The young man happens to be from a wealthy family, so Ursula and Leo intend to split whatever they can get.

A magazine writer, Anne Perry (Martha Hyer), is romanced by Leo and persuaded to do an article about The Hut, which is mainly about him. Leo gets an agent and Hollywood offers, and seems on top of the world until a scorned Anne exposes him publicly for the cad he is, as does Ursula, who is pregnant with his child.

Cast
 Frankie Vaughan as Leo Mack
 Martha Hyer as Anne Perry
 Juliet Prowse as Ursula Poe
 Gary Crosby as Rip Hullet
 David McLean as Bill Sukolovic
 Jesse White as Brian Freer
 Jane Withers as Liz Fargo-Life Magazine Photographer
 Rachel Stephens as Helen
 Steve Harris as Mitch Mack
 Paul von Schreiber as Granny
 Robert Casper as Horace Wetheridge Tobey III

Production
The film was based on Garson Kanin's play The Live Wire which debuted on Broadway in August 1950.

Film rights were bought by 20th Century Fox who originally announced it as a vehicle for Elvis Presley once the latter got out of the army.

The film was announced by Fox executive Bob Goldstein in September 1960. It was turned into a star vehicle for Frankie Vaughan who had just made Let's Make Love for Fox.

The title was changed to No Right to Love.

References

External links
 
 
 
 

1961 films
Films directed by David Butler
Films scored by Dominic Frontiere
20th Century Fox films
1960s English-language films